There are some Iranian and Iraqi parties known as Worker-Communist Parties. They all originate from the WCPIran.

Left Worker-communist Party of Iraq
Leftist Worker-Communist Party of Iraq
Worker-communist Party of Iran
Worker-communist Party of Iran – Hekmatist
Worker-communist Party of Iraq
Worker-communist Party of Kurdistan

See also
Workers Communist Party
Communist Workers Party